Estadio León Gómez is a football stadium in Tela, Honduras.  It is currently used mostly for football matches and is the home stadium of Parrillas One.  The stadium holds 3,000 spectators.

External links
Stadium information

Leon Gomez